Matt McCarty (born c. 1980) is an American football coach. He is the head football coach at Northwestern College in Orange City, Iowa, a position he has held since the 2016 season. McCarty led the Northwestern Red Raiders to the NAIA Football National Championship title in 2022.

McCarty played college football as a defensive back at Northwestern from 2000 to 2003.

Head coaching record

References

External links
 Northwestern (IA) profile

Year of birth missing (living people)
Living people
American football defensive backs
Northwestern Red Raiders baseball players
Northwestern Red Raiders football coaches
Northwestern Red Raiders football players
High school football coaches in Iowa